The Patriots Jet Team is a civilian aerobatic formation team that performs in air shows across the western United States of America. The team operates as a six-ship team, flying the Czech-built Aero L-39 Albatros. The Patriots are based in Byron, California.

The team began flying demonstrations in 2003 with two L-39 aircraft. In the 2004 airshow season, a third L-39 was added. With the success of the 2005 season, the Patriots added a fourth jet for the 2006 season. In 2010, the Patriots Jet Team expanded to a six-ship aerobatic formation team.

The team is owned by Randy Howell, a former United Airlines pilot. It is sponsored by companies including Hot Line Construction, Inc. and supported by a ground crew of more than 25 volunteers.

Fleet

References

External links 

 Patriots Jet Team official website

American aerobatic teams